Mount Dumais is a bluff-type mountain in Antarctica,  high, standing on the southwest edge of Mackin Table, 2 nautical miles (4 km) north of Lekander Nunatak, in the southern Patuxent Range, Pensacola Mountains. It was mapped by the United States Geological Survey from surveys and U.S. Navy air photos, 1956–66, and was named by the Advisory Committee on Antarctic Names for Lieutenant Clarence C. Dumais (MC) of the U.S. Navy, who was the officer in charge of South Pole Station in the winter of 1960.

References 

Mountains of Queen Elizabeth Land
Pensacola Mountains